Vallie Ennis Eaves (September 6, 1911 – April 19, 1960) was an American professional baseball pitcher. He played in Major League Baseball (MLB) from 1935 to 1942 for the Philadelphia Athletics, Chicago White Sox, and Chicago Cubs.

Eaves died of lung cancer on April 19, 1960, in Norman, Oklahoma.

References

External links

1911 births
1960 deaths
Abilene Blue Sox players
Bartlesville Bucs players
Baseball players from Oklahoma
Borger Gassers players
Brownsville Charros players
Bryan/Del Rio Indians players
Chattanooga Lookouts players
Chicago Cubs players
Chicago White Sox players
Deaths from cancer in Oklahoma
Deaths from lung cancer
Galveston Buccaneers players
Galveston White Caps players
Gladewater Bears players
Greenville Bucks players
Hobbs Sports players
Lake Charles Lakers players
Major League Baseball pitchers
Meridian Millers players
Milwaukee Brewers (minor league) players
Minneapolis Millers (baseball) players
Minot Mallards players
Montgomery Rebels players
Nashville Vols players
Oklahoma City Indians players
Philadelphia Athletics players
People from Allen, Oklahoma
Port Arthur Sea Hawks players
Roswell Rockets players
San Diego Padres (minor league) players
Shreveport Sports players
Sweetwater Swatters players
Texarkana Bears players
Toronto Maple Leafs (International League) players
Wichita Falls players